Chipewyan  or Denesuline, often simply called Dene, is the language spoken by the Chipewyan people of northwestern Canada. It is categorized as part of the Northern Athabaskan language family. Dënësųłinë́ has nearly 12,000 speakers in Canada, mostly in Saskatchewan, Alberta, Manitoba and the Northwest Territories. It has official status only in the Northwest Territories, alongside 8 other aboriginal languages: Cree, Tlicho, Gwich'in, Inuktitut, Inuinnaqtun, Inuvialuktun, North Slavey and South Slavey.

Most Chipewyan people now use Dené and Dënësųłinë́ to refer to themselves as a people and to their language, respectively. The Saskatchewan communities of Fond-du-Lac, Black Lake, Wollaston Lake and La Loche are among these.

Phonology

Consonants
The 39 consonants of Dënesųłiné:

Vowels

Dënesųłinë́ has vowels of 6 differing qualities.

Most vowels can be either

 oral or nasal. Nasals are marked with an ogonek in the orthography: ⟨ą ę ę̈ ı̨ ǫ ų⟩.
 short or long

As a result, Dënesųłinë́ has 24 phonemic vowels:

Dënesųłinë́ also has 9 oral and nasal diphthongs of the form vowel + .

Tone
Dënësųłinë́ has two tones:
 high (marked with acute accents in the orthography: ⟨á é ë́ ı́ ó ú⟩)
 low

Demographics

In the 2011 Canada Census 11,860 people chose Dene as their mother tongue. 70.6% were located in 
Saskatchewan and 15.2% were located in Alberta.

7,955 were in Saskatchewan 
1,680 were in Alberta (the Dene Tha' First Nation a Dene/South Slavey group (approximately 1000 people) are included in this total)
1,005 were in Manitoba
450 were in the Northwest Territories
70 were in British Columbia 
45 were in the Yukon  
20 were in Ontario

Not all were from the historical Chipewyan regions south and east of Great Slave Lake. 
Approximately 11,000 of those who chose Dene as their mother tongue in 2011 are Dene/Chipewyan with 7,955 (72%) in Saskatchewan, 1,005 (9%) in Manitoba, 510 plus urban dwellers in Alberta and 260 plus urban dwellers in the Northwest Territories. The communities within the Dene/Chipewyan traditional areas are shown below:

Saskatchewan

The Dene (Dënesųłiné) speaking communities of Saskatchewan are located in the northern half of the province. The area from the upper Churchill River west of Pinehouse Lake all the way north to Lake Athabasca and from Lake Athabasca east to the north end of Reindeer Lake is home to 7410 people who chose Dene as their mother tongue in 2011.

Prince Albert had 265 residents who chose Dene as their mother tongue in 2011, Saskatoon had 165, the La Ronge Population Centre had 55 and Meadow Lake had 30.

3,050 were in the Lake Athabasca-Fond du Lac River area including Black Lake and Wollaston Lake in the communities of:

Fond-du-Lac 705 out of 874 residents chose Dene as their mother tongue in 2011.
Stony Rapids 140 out of 243 residents chose Dene as their mother tongue in 2011.
Black Lake (Chicken 224) 1040 out of 1070 residents chose Dene as their mother tongue in 2011.
Uranium City (hamlet)
Camsell Portage (hamlet)
Wollaston Lake 
Wollaston Post (Lac La Hache 220) 1165 out of 1251 residents chose Dene as their mother tongue in 2011.

3,920 were in the upper Churchill River area including Peter Pond Lake, Churchill Lake, Lac La Loche, Descharme Lake, Garson Lake and Turnor Lake in the communities of:

La Loche 2,300 out 2,611 chose Dene as their mother tongue in 2011.
Clearwater River 720 out of 778 residents chose Dene as their mother tongue in 2011.
Black Point (hamlet)
Bear Creek (hamlet)
Garson Lake (hamlet)
Descharme Lake (hamlet)
Turnor Lake 
Turnor Lake (Birch Narrows First Nation) 70 out of 419 residents chose Dene as their mother tongue in 2011.
Dillon (Buffalo River Dene Nation) 330 out of 764 residents chose Dene as their mother tongue in 2011.
St. George's Hill, Saskatchewan 85 out of 100 residents chose Dene as their mother tongue in 2011.
Michel Village 55 out of 66 residents chose Dene as their mother tongue in 2011.
Buffalo Narrows 35 out of 1153 residents chose Dene as their mother tongue in 2011.
Patuanak 35 out of 64 residents chose Dene as their mother tongue in 2011.
Patuanak (Wapachewunak 1920) 265 out of 482 residents chose Dene as their mother tongue in 2011.
Beauval (La Plonge 192) 25 out of 115 residents chose Dene as their mother tongue in 2011.

Manitoba
Two isolated communities are in northern Manitoba. The two Manitoban communities use Déné Syllabics to write their language.
 
Lac Brochet (197 A) 720 out of 816 residents chose Dene as their mother tongue in 2011.
Tadoule Lake (Churchill 1) 170 out of 321 residents chose Dene as their mother tongue in 2011.

Alberta
The Wood Buffalo-Cold Lake Economic Region in the north eastern portion of Alberta from Fort Chipewyan to the Cold Lake area has the following communities. 510 residents of this region chose Dene as their mother tongue in 2011.

Fort Chipewyan 45 out of 847 residents chose Dene as their mother tongue in 2011.
Fort McKay 30 out of 562 residents chose Dene as their mother tongue in 2011.
Janvier (Janvier 194) 145 out of 295 residents chose Dene as their mother tongue in 2011.
Janvier South 35 out of 104 residents chose Dene as their mother tongue in 2011.
Cold Lake 149 105 out of 594 residents chose Dene as their mother tongue in 2011.
Cold Lake 149 B, Alberta 25 out of 149 residents chose Dene as their mother tongue in 2011.

Northwest Territories
Three communities are located south of Great Slave Lake in Region 5. 260 residents of Region 5 chose Dene as their mother tongue in 2011.

Fort Smith 30 out of 2093 residents chose Dene as their mother tongue in 2011.
Fort Resolution 95 out of 474 residents chose Dene as their mother tongue in 2011.
Lutselk'e 120 out of 295 residents chose Dene as their mother tongue in 2011.

See also

Chipewyan syllabics
Chipewyan people

References

Bibliography

 Cook, Eung-Do. (2004). A Grammar of Dëne Sųłiné (Chipewyan). Algonquian and Iroquoian Linguistics - Special Athabaskan Number, Memoir 17. Winnipeg: Algonquian and Iroquoian Linguistics. .
 Cook, Eung-Do. 2006. "The Patterns of Consonantal Acquisition and Change in Chipewyan (Dëne Sųłiné)". International Journal of American Linguistics. 72, no. 2: 236.
 De Reuse, Willem. 2006. "A Grammar of Dëne Sųłiné (Chipewyan) (Cook)". International Journal of American Linguistics. 72, no. 4: 535.
 Elford, Leon W. Dene sųłiné yati ditł'ísé = Dene sųłiné reader. Prince Albert, SK: Northern Canada Mission Distributors, 2001. 
 Gessner, S. 2005. "Properties of Tone in Dëne Sųłiné". Amsterdam Studies in the Theory and History of Linguistic Science. Series IV, Current Issues in Linguistic Theory. 269: 229-248.
 Li, Fang-Kuei. (1946). Chipewyan. In C. Osgood & H. Hoijer (Eds.), Linguistic Structures of Native America (pp. 398–423). New York: The Viking Fund Publications in Anthropology (No. 6). (Reprinted 1963, 1965, 1967, & 1971, New York: Johnson Reprint Corp.).

External links

 First Voices Dene Community Portal
 Our Languages: Dene (Saskatchewan Indian Cultural Centre)
 OLAC resources in and about the Chipewyan language
 Kirkby, William West: The New Testament, translated into the Chipewyan language = ᑎᑎ ᗂᒋ ᕞᐢᕞᒣᐣᕠ (Didi gothi testementi). London, 1881 (Peel 986)

Northern Athabaskan languages
Indigenous languages of the North American eastern woodlands
Indigenous languages of the North American Subarctic
First Nations languages in Canada
American Book Award winners